Twin Hype was an American rap trio, originating from New Jersey. Consisting of twin brothers Glennis Brown (the Sly) and Lennis Brown (Slick) along with Jose Matos born August 14 1968 (DJ King Shameek).

Career
The twins started rapping together at the age of 15 in high school contests. They were originally from South Carolina and moved up the east coast, first moving to Washington, D.C. and the suburbs in Maryland and Virginia, then eventually landing in New Jersey. They released two albums on Profile Records: Twin Hype (1989) and Double Barrel (1991). The single "Do It to the Crowd" was their first single release and the most successful. In rotation in alternative and college radio, it charted at number 69 on the UK Singles Chart and number 10 on the US Dance Chart. The second single "For Those Who Like to Groove" reached number 8 on the US Dance Chart. They released hip house single "Nothin' Could Save Ya" in 1991.

Discography

Albums

Singles

References

East Coast hip hop groups
Profile Records artists